Mehendiganj  is a town in Barisal District in the division of Barisal, Bangladesh. It is the administrative headquarter and urban centre of Mehendiganj Upazila.

References

Populated places in Barisal District